Beecroft Rugby Club is an amateur rugby union club which fields five Grade teams and two Colts teams in the Premier 1st Division of the New South Wales Suburban Rugby Union.

The club grew as a logical extension of a highly successful junior clubs that have provided sporting opportunity through Rugby for generations of boys and young men in the Hills district. The club has excellent relations with all local junior clubs within the area, and is committed to the best ideals of sport and social integration for the youth of the area.

History 

Beecroft Rugby Club had its origins in the St Leo’s Old Boys RUFC, which thrived for years until the school changed focus and its player stream dried up. It then amalgamated with Ku-Ring-Gai High Old Boys, but over time it became obvious that there were too many suburban clubs on the north shore for the number of available players. The club then moved to Hills area, where the Beecroft Rugby Club was born and thrives to this day.

In the fifteen rugby seasons Beecroft has been in the suburban competition, the club has made fifteen grand finals in various grades. It has virtually rocketed through the various divisions of the NSW Suburban Rugby Union competition and is currently in the 1st Division of that competition. The club has also competed in the Under 85 kg competition since its inauguration in 2006. In the three years of the competition Beecroft has competed in each Grand Final, winning the State Title in 2006 and 2008.

From 2006 to 2008 in particular the club had tremendous success on the playing field. In 2006 while in the 2nd Division the 1st Grade team won the Barraclough Cup and the 4th Grade team the Richardson Cup. In 2007 this feat was repeated with the 1st Grade team again winning the Barraclough Cup and the 4th Grade team likewise winning the Richardson Cup.

In 2008, the club was promoted to 1st Division following its success in the 2nd Division competition in 2007, and had quite a successful season with the 1st Grade team reaching the Kentwell Cup grand final and the club finishing in a very creatable fourth place on the Club Championship table, a truly outstanding result for the club.

Honours 
Club Awards
2008 - NSW Suburban 1st Division Club of the Year
2007 - NSW Suburban 2nd Division Club Champions
2006 - NSW Suburban Rugby Club of the Year and NSW Suburban 2nd Division Club of the Year
2003 - NSW Suburban 2nd Division Club Champions
2001 - NSW Suburban Rugby Club of the Year and NSW Suburban 3rd Division Club Champions

Premierships 

1st Grade
2007 - Barraclough Cup
2006 - Barraclough Cup
2002 - Barraclough Cup

2nd Grade
2001 - Farrant Cup

3rd Grade
2001 - Campbell Cup
4th Grade
2007 - Richardson Cup
2006 - Richardson Cup
2002 - Richardson Cup

Under 85 kg
2008 - Premiers
2006 - Premiers

Club Captains 

2013 - Angus Donovan
2012 - Tom Berkhout
2011 - Tom Berkout
2010 - Tom Berkhout
2009 - Tom Berkhout

2008 - Nick Childs
2007 - Nick Childs
2006 - Nick Childs
2005 - Nick Childs
2004 - Mark Baker

2003 - Mark Baker
2002 - Mark Baker
2001 - Mark Baker
2000 - Mark Baker
1999 - Paul Warton
1998 - Dave Proctor

NSW Suburban XV Representatives 

A. Dwyer 
A. Rasuka 
B. Walters 
D. Berkhout 
D. O’Riordan 
D. Schofield 
J. Walters 

S. Cumming 
S. Guest
T. Bowen 
T. Kelly 
G. Konz 
R. McCann 
V. Seuseu 

G. Donian 
T. Nakauta 
S. Yalayaia 
M. Daff
B. Gordon
I. Meehan
J. "The Rhino" Ryan
M. Dick

NSW Suburban Under 85kg 
A. Dwyer
D. Berkhout
D. Schofield 
L. Broughton-Rouse

Club Patrons 
Mayor for Hornsby - Cr Nick Berman

Rugby union teams in Sydney
Rugby clubs established in 1998
1998 establishments in Australia